Ledyanaya (meaning "Icy"), is a peak in the Koryak Mountains. Administratively it is part of the Kamchatka Krai, Russian Federation.

It is a rocky peak topped by an ice cap, part of the Ukelayat Range, in the Ukelayat river basin.

See also
List of mountains and hills of Russia

References

External links
The highest peaks in Russia

Koryak Mountains